The 2012 Mid-American Conference women's basketball tournament was the post-season basketball tournament for the Mid-American Conference (MAC) 2011–12 college basketball season. The 2012 tournament was held March 3–10, 2012. Second seeded Eastern Michigan won the championship over fifth seeded Central Michigan. Tavelyn James of Eastern Michigan was the MVP.

Format
First round games were held on campus sites at the higher seed on March 3. The remaining rounds were held at Quicken Loans Arena, between March 7–10.  The top two seeds received byes into the semifinals, with the three and four seeds receiving a bye to the quarterfinals.

Seeds

Bracket

All-Tournament Team
Tournament MVP – Tavelyn James, Bowling Green

References

Mid-American Conference women's basketball tournament
2011–12 Mid-American Conference women's basketball season
MAC women's basketball tournament
MAC women's basketball tournament
Basketball competitions in Cleveland
College basketball tournaments in Ohio
Women's sports in Ohio
2010s in Cleveland